Derrick Roberson (born March 12, 1985) is a former American football cornerback. He was signed by the Houston Texans as an undrafted free agent in 2007. He played college football at Rutgers.

Roberson has also been a member of the Baltimore Ravens, Minnesota Vikings, Cleveland Browns, and Tampa Bay Buccaneers.

References

External links
 Tampa Bay Buccaneers bio

1985 births
Living people
Players of American football from Florida
American football cornerbacks
Rutgers Scarlet Knights football players
Houston Texans players
Baltimore Ravens players
Minnesota Vikings players
Cleveland Browns players
People from Oakland Park, Florida
Sportspeople from Broward County, Florida
Tampa Bay Buccaneers players